Group A was one of two groups in the second group stage of the 1974 FIFA World Cup finals. It was the first time that this stage of the competition (equivalent to the quarter-finals) was played in a group format. Matches were played in three cities (Dortmund, Gelsenkirchen and Hanover) between 26 June and 3 July 1974. The group was composed of the winners of Groups 1 and 3 from the first group stage (East Germany and Netherlands), and the runners-up of Groups 2 and 4 (Brazil and Argentina).

The Netherlands won the group after winning all three of their matches to qualify for the final, while Brazil won their matches against East Germany and Argentina to finish in second place and qualify for the third-place play-off. East Germany and Argentina drew their match to finish level on one point, but East Germany's superior goal difference meant they finished the higher of the two.

Qualified teams
The winners of Group 1 and 3 and the runners-up of Group 2 and 4 qualified for Group A of the second round.

Standings

Matches
All times listed are local (CET)

Netherlands vs Argentina

Brazil vs East Germany

Argentina vs Brazil

East Germany vs Netherlands

Argentina vs East Germany

Netherlands vs Brazil

References

External links

Group A
Argentina at the 1974 FIFA World Cup
Brazil at the 1974 FIFA World Cup
Netherlands at the 1974 FIFA World Cup
East Germany at the 1974 FIFA World Cup